Achatinella buddii is an extinct species of land snail, a gastropod in the family Achatinellidae. It was endemic to Oahu.

References

†buddii
Extinct gastropods
Molluscs of Hawaii
Endemic fauna of Hawaii
Taxonomy articles created by Polbot
ESA endangered species